Ersa , also designated Jupiter LXXI, is a small outer natural satellite of Jupiter discovered by Scott S. Sheppard on 11 May 2018, using the 4.0-meter Víctor M. Blanco Telescope at Cerro Tololo Observatory, Chile. It was announced alongside nine other Jovian moons on 17 July 2018 and it provisionally designated S/2018 J 1 by the Minor Planet Center, after observations were collected over a long enough time span to confirm the satellite's orbit. The satellite has been found in precovery observations as early as 6 August 2000.

Name

The moon was named in 2019 after Ersa, the Greek goddess of dew, daughter of Zeus and Selene: Herse (Jupiter L) is also named for this goddess. The name was suggested in a naming contest held by the Carnegie Institute on Twitter, where more than twenty tweets suggested the name, including Aaron Quah (@8603103) who submitted the name first, StSauveur_MoonsProject (@StSauMoons) that are the 12th grade students of Saint Sauveur High School in Redon, France, the fifth grade at Hillside Traditional Academy in British Columbia, Canada (submitted on their behalf by @mrgrouchypants), and a 4-year-old child who sang a song about Ersa (submitted on his behalf by @Thoreson).

It belongs to the prograde Himalia group which are given names ending in a.

Orbit 
Like all of Jupiter's irregular moons, Ersa orbits far enough away that it is highly subject to gravitational perturbations by the Sun and other planets, which makes its orbit highly variable over time.

References 

Himalia group
Moons of Jupiter
Irregular satellites
20180511
Discoveries by Scott S. Sheppard
Moons with a prograde orbit